Zoran Radojičić (born 24 October 1963) is a Serbian pediatric surgeon and politician who served as the mayor of Belgrade from 2018 to 2022.

Biography

Early life and education 
He was born on 24 October 1963 in Lazarevac, Serbia, at the time part of Yugoslavia. In 1989, he graduated from the University of Belgrade Faculty of Medicine, and later obtained magisterial and doctoral thesis in 1998 and 2006, respectively.

Medical career 
Before taking political office in 2018, he practiced pediatric urology at University Children's Hospital in Belgrade, and he is also a professor of surgery at the University of Belgrade Faculty of Medicine.

Political career 
On 7 June 2018, he was appointed as the Mayor of Belgrade on the nomination of Serbian Progressive Party (SNS), following the 2018 Belgrade City Assembly elections. Although Radojičić was the mayor, deputy mayor Goran Vesić wielded more power and influence and was sometimes described as de facto mayor. Radojičić left office on 20 June 2022 when he was succeeded by Aleksandar Šapić.

Personal life 
He is married to Tijana and has two sons with her – Ivan and Ognjen.

References

External links

1963 births
Living people
Mayors of Belgrade
Serbian pediatric surgeons
Serbian politicians
University of Belgrade Faculty of Medicine alumni